The 1995 Ferris State Bulldogs football team represented Ferris State University as a member of the Midwest Intercollegiate Football Conference (MIFC) during the 1995 NCAA Division II football season. In their second year under head coach Jeff Pierce, the Bulldogs compiled a 10–0 record in the regular season.

Schedule

References

Ferris State
Ferris State Bulldogs football seasons
Ferris State Bulldogs football